{{Infobox royalty
| name = Sima Zhao司馬昭
| image = SimaZhao.jpg
| image_size = 220px
| caption = A Qing dynasty illustration of Sima Zhao (right)
| succession = King of Jin (晉王)
| reign = 2 May 264 – 6 September 265
| reign-type = Tenure
| successor = Sima Yan
| succession1 = Duke of Jin (晉公)
| reign1 = 9 December 263<ref>{{quote|Because the campaign against Shu was going well, Sima Zhao was once more offered the position of Chancellor of the State [xiangguo], as well as the title Duke of Jin and the Nine Awards. This time, Sima Zhao accepted these honors.}}
Zizhi Tongjian, Sima Guang</ref>

Career up to 255
Incident at Gaoping Tombs

Sima Zhao's involvement in his father's coup d'état against the regent Cao Shuang in 249 is unclear.  According to the Book of Jin, he was not told about the plan, hatched by his father and his older brother, until the last minute—a view disagreed with by other historians, who assert that he was intimately involved in the planning. Regardless, in the aftermath of the successful coup his father became the paramount political authority in Wei, and he himself received an addition of 1,000 households to his fief and became important in status. In 251, when his father suppressed the failed rebellion of Wang Ling, Sima Zhao served as deputy commander, and was rewarded with the addition of 300 households to his fief and a Marquis post for his young son, Sima You. During the next few years, he was involved in commanding forces in repelling invasions by Shu's commander of the armed forces, Jiang Wei.

Battle of Dongxing

In 253, Wei forces headed by Sima Zhao marched east to confront Wu, who had been overstepping their boundaries by building upon a lake and arming it with men on land which belonged to Wei. The Wei officers, feeling secure in their position and with their superior numbers, grew arrogant and allowed themselves to become drunk, and so were quickly overwhelmed by the Wu forces led by Ding Feng and Lü Ju, forcing the Wei forces to flee and retreat. After the loss at the Battle of Dongxing, Sima Zhao asked his Marshal Wang Yi in private who was responsible for the failure of the battle, to which Wang Yi responded: "Responsibility lies with the army commander." Sima Zhao retorted: "The Marshal means to make me shoulder the blame?" Thereafter he had Wang Yi executed. Sima Shi, the Wei regent and Sima Zhao's older brother, received memorials from ministers asking that Wang Chang, Guanqiu Jian, Hu Zun, and all the others who were a part of the campaign to be demoted for their failure, however, Sima Shi stated that: "It is because I did not listen to Gongxiu [Zhuge Dan] that we have come to this plight. In this I am culpable; how can the generals be at fault?" He therefore promoted the generals who partook in the battle, while demoting Sima Zhao by removing his enfeoffment.

Succeeding Sima Shi
In 254, while Sima Zhao was at the capital Luoyang, advisors to the Wei emperor, Cao Fang, suggested that the emperor surprise Sima Zhao and kill him to seize his troops, and then use those troops against Sima Shi. Cao Fang, apprehensive, did not act on the suggestion, but the plot was still discovered, and Sima Zhao assisted his brother in deposing the emperor and replacing him with Cao Mao.  In the aftermath of the removal of the emperor, the generals Guanqiu Jian and Wen Qin rebelled in 255 but were defeated by Sima Shi.

Sima Shi, however, had a serious eye illness that was aggravated by the campaign, and he died less than a month later; on 23 March. At that time, Sima Zhao was with his brother at Xuchang. The 14-year-old emperor Cao Mao made an effort to regain imperial power. He issued an edict which, under the rationale that Sima Shi had just quelled Guanqiu Jian and Wen Qin's rebellion and that the southeastern empire was still not completely pacified, ordered Sima Zhao to remain at Xuchang and that Sima Shi's assistant Fu Jia return to Luoyang with the main troops. Under Fu Jia and Zhong Hui's advice, however, Sima Zhao returned to Luoyang anyway against edict, and was able to maintain control of the government. Indeed, from that point on, he did not let Cao Mao or Empress Dowager Guo out of his control.

As paramount authority
Consolidation of authority
Third Rebellion of Shouchun

During the next few years, Sima Zhao consolidated his authority further, leaving the emperor and empress dowager with little power. He further built up a series of events that were viewed as precipitations to usurpation of the Wei throne. In 256, he had the emperor grant him the privilege of wearing imperial robes, crowns, and boots. He further tested waters by having his close aides hinting to the generals around the empire as to his intentions. In 257, when he sent Jia Chong to probe Zhuge Dan's intentions, Zhuge rebuked Jia Chong severely
—leading Sima Zhao to summon Zhuge Dan back to the capital under the guise of a promotion. Zhuge Dan refused and started a rebellion, submitting himself to Eastern Wu for protection. Sima Zhao advanced quickly on Zhuge Dan's stronghold of Shouchun and surrounded it, eventually capturing the city in 258 after cutting off any hope of an Eastern Wu rescue, killing Zhuge Dan and his family, although he treated many of those involved, such as the common citizens, and most notably the Wu soldiers who had been sent as reinforcements, with great magnanimity, despite being advised to punish the citizens and kill all the soldiers, to which he retorted: "The ancients in using troops, preserving the state is best, so kill the leaders and nothing more. Should the Wú soldiers escape and flee back, then they can report the greatness of the central states." This benevolence managed to cast the Sima family in a more, and much-needed, positive light amongst the populace. After Zhuge Dan's death, there was no one who dared to oppose Sima Zhao further for the next few years.  In 258, he would force the emperor to offer him the Nine Bestowments, state chancellorship, and the title of Duke of Jin—a step that put him closer to usurpation—and then publicly declined them nine times.

Death of Cao Mao and complete control of the Wei government

In May 260, Sima Zhao again forced Cao Mao to issue an edict granting Sima Zhao the Nine Bestowments and the promotions, which Sima Zhao declined again, but which drew Cao Mao's ire. He gathered his associates Wang Shen, Wang Jing, and Wang Ye and told them that, while he knew the chances of success were slight, he was going to act against Sima Zhao. He took lead of the imperial guards, armed himself with a sword, and set out toward Sima Zhao's mansion. Sima Zhao's brother Sima Zhou tried to resist, but after Cao Mao's attendants yelled loudly, Sima Zhou's forces deserted. Jia Chong then arrived and intercepted the imperial guards. Cao Mao fought personally, and Jia Chong's troops, not daring to attack the emperor, were also deserting. One of the officers under Jia Chong's command, Cheng Ji (成濟), after asking Jia what to do and was told by Jia to defend the Sima power regardless of the consequences, took a spear and killed Cao Mao with it. This left Sima Zhao thoroughly vexed.

After Cao Mao's death, public sentiments called for Jia Chong's death, but what Sima Zhao did first was to force Empress Dowager Guo to posthumously demote Cao Mao to common citizen status and order that he be buried as such. He also executed Wang Jing and his family. The next day, after pleas from his uncle Sima Fu, Sima Zhao instead had Empress Dowager Guo order that Cao Mao be demoted back to a duke, but buried with the ceremonies of an imperial prince. Sima Zhao then summoned Cao Huan, the Duke of Changdao, and a grandson of Cao Cao, to the capital to become the emperor; by now, Empress Dowager Guo was powerless to speak further. In the midst of these events, Sima Zhao went on to decline the Nine Bestowments and the promotions towards state chancellorship and the title of Duke of Jin. Some days later, Sima Zhao publicly accused Cheng Ji and his brothers of treason and had them and their family executed to appease public sentiment while sparing Jia Chong. No one dared to act against Sima Zhao even in the aftermaths of the emperor's death, however, for Sima Zhao was effectively the imperial authority by this point. On 27 June, Cao Huan entered Luoyang and became emperor. Two days later, Sima Zhao forced Cao Huan to confer upon him the Nine Bestowments as well as the promotions towards state chancellorship and the title of Duke of Jin, which he earnestly declined, as well as another time in October.

Conquest of Shu

In 262, aggravated by Jiang Wei's incessant border attacks, Sima Zhao considered hiring assassins to murder Jiang Wei, but this plan was opposed by his advisor, Xun Xu. Zhong Hui himself believed that Jiang Wei had worn out his troops and that it would be an appropriate time to try to destroy Shu once and for all. Sima Zhao put Zhong Hui, Zhuge Xu, and Deng Ai in charge of the invasion forces (even though the latter initially opposed the campaign), and they set out in autumn 263.

Zhong Hui, Zhuge Xu, and Deng Ai faced little opposition from Shu's forces, whose strategy was to draw the Wei forces in and then close on them—a strategy that backfired, as the Wei forces, much quicker than expected, leapt past Shu border cities and immediately onto the important Yang'an Pass (陽安關; in present-day Hanzhong, Shaanxi), capturing it. Zhuge Xu was eventually expelled and sent back as a prisoner, though, as Deng Ai wanted to merge his own troops with Zhuge Xu's, whereas Zhuge Xu did not deviate from the original plan; he met up with Zhong Hui, who wanted to monopolize on the military situation, and so sent an edict mentioning the cowardice of Zhuge Xu, after which the latter's troops were merged with Zhong Hui's. Jiang Wei was able to regroup and block off the Wei forces from further advances, until Deng Ai led his troops over a treacherous mountain pass, descending on Jiangyou, defeating Zhuge Zhan and heading directly for the Shu capital, Chengdu. Surprised by Deng Ai's quick advances and believing that Jiang Wei would be unable to return fast enough to defend the capital against Deng Ai, the Shu emperor, Liu Shan, surrendered to Wei. Earlier this year, in the spring of 263, Sima Zhao had again declined the Nine Bestowments and the promotions, but during the campaign, in light of the recent successes, on 9 December 263, the emperor, Cao Huan, bestowed upon Sima Zhao the title of the Duke of Jin, the Nine Bestowments, and the position of Chancellor of the State, which Sima Zhao finally accepted.

Zhong Hui's Rebellion

Another turmoil quickly came after Shu's destruction, however. Deng Ai, proud of his achievements, became arrogant in his correspondence with Sima Zhao, drawing Sima Zhao's suspicion.  Zhong Hui, who had plans to rebel himself, quickly forged letters that further damaged the relations between Sima Zhao and Deng Ai beyond repair, and Sima Zhao ordered Zhong Hui to arrest Deng Ai, although he himself, wary of Zhong Hui, nevertheless arrived with his own forces and stationed at Chang'an. Zhong Hui did so, seizing Deng Ai's troops and merging them with his own, and then, with Jiang Wei as his assistant (but with Jiang Wei's actual intentions being to eventually kill Zhong Hui and restore Shu), declared a rebellion in 264, but his troops rebelled against him and killed both him and Jiang Wei, with Sima Zhao going on to bestow an amnesty upon all in Shu.

Death
After Zhong Hui's rebellion was defeated, Sima Zhao was granted the title of King of Jin on 2 May 264, the penultimate step to usurpation. He set out to revise the laws and the civil service system in accordance with how he would want his own empire to be, such as instating the Five Feudal Ranks of Zhou (a system which had fallen out of use since the Qin dynasty abolished it), and also going on to posthumously enfeoff his father, Sima Yi, and older brother, Sima Shi, as King Xuan of Jin and King Jing of Jin respectively. He further sought peace with Eastern Wu, to prevent further complications for his planned takeover, a gesture that was reciprocated.

Later that year, Sima Zhao considered whom to make his heir. He strongly considered his talented younger son, Sima You, who had been adopted by Sima Shi because Sima Shi did not have sons of his own, under the rationale that because Sima Shi had great achievement in the Simas' obtaining and retaining of power, the succession should go back to his son. The majority of his advisors, however, recommended his oldest son, Sima Yan, instead, and Sima Zhao finally resolved to make Sima Yan his designated heir.

On 6 September 265, Sima Zhao died before he could receive actual imperial authority, although he was buried with imperial honors on 20 October 265. Five months later, however, Sima Yan, who had previously inherited his father's authority, would have the Wei emperor, Cao Huan, abdicate in favour of him, ending Wei and establishing the Jin dynasty. After he did so, he posthumously honoured his father, Sima Zhao, as Emperor Wen of Jin (晉文帝).

Family
Consorts and Issue:
 Empress Wenming, of the Wang clan of Donghai (217–268), personal name Yuanji
 Princess Jingzhao
 Married Zhen De of Xiping, and had issue (one son)
 Sima Yan, Emperor Wu (236–290), first son
 Sima You, Prince Qixian (248–283), second son
 Sima Zhao, Prince Ai of Chengyang, third son
 Sima Dingguo, Prince Daohui of Liaodong, fourth son
 Sima Guangde, Prince Shang of Guanghan, fifth son
Lady of Cultivated Splendidness, of the Li clan (修華  李氏), personal name Yan (琰)
Lady of Cultivated Countenance, of the Wang clan  (修容 王氏), personal name Xuan (宣)
Lady of Cultivated Deportment, of the Xu clan (修儀 徐氏), personal name Yan (琰)
Lady of Handsome Fairness, of the Wu clan (婕妤 吳氏), personal name Shu (淑)
Lady of Sufficient Countenance , of the Zhao clan (充華 趙氏), personal name Ting (珽)
 Unknown
 Sima Jian, Prince Ping of Le'an (d. 297), sixth son
 Sima Ji, Prince Yan, seventh son
 Sima Yongzuo, eighth son
 Sima Yanzuo, Prince Leping, ninth son
 Princess Changshan, married Wang Ji

Ancestry

In popular culture

Sima Zhao is first introduced as a playable character in the seventh instalment of Koei's Dynasty Warriors video game series, in which he is depicted as having a lazy and carefree atmosphere, but underneath it actually being a talented leader and strategist. He is then introduced again as a playable character in Warriors Orochi 3.

See also
 Chinese emperors family tree (early)
 Lists of people of the Three Kingdoms

Notes

References

 Chen, Shou (3rd century). Records of the Three Kingdoms (Sanguozhi).
 
 Fang, Xuanling (648). Book of Jin (Jin Shu).
 Pei, Songzhi (5th century). Annotations to Records of the Three Kingdoms (Sanguozhi zhu).
 Sima, Guang (1084). Zizhi Tongjian''.

211 births
265 deaths
3rd-century viceregal rulers
Cao Wei generals
Cao Wei regents
Three Rebellions in Shouchun